Woodford County is a county located in the U.S. state of Kentucky. As of the 2020 census, the population was 26,871. Its county seat is Versailles. The area was home to Pisgah Academy. Woodford County is part of the Lexington-Fayette, KY Metropolitan Statistical Area. It is located in the center of the Bluegrass region of Kentucky.

History
The county was formed from a part of Fayette County, Virginia in 1788. It was named for William Woodford, an American Revolutionary War general from Virginia who died while a prisoner of war in 1780. It was the last of the original nine counties established that formed the Commonwealth of Kentucky in 1792.

Scott County was formed from part of the county in 1792. Franklin County took another part of the county in 1794.

Queen Elizabeth II stayed in Woodford County at Lane's End Farm in May 2007. She also attended the Kentucky Derby in Louisville.

Pisgah Academy
Pisgah Academy was a school in Woodford County. It was established by Col. Alexander Dunlap. The Library of Congress has photographs of the church and academy.

The Kentucky Historical Society has a photograph of the school building.

Notable residents
John J. Crittenden, governor of Kentucky
John Cabell Breckinridge, vice-president of the United States
William Campbell Preston Breckinridge, Representative from Kentucky
George B. Kinkead, who served as Kentucky secretary of state 
William Taylor Barry
Dr. Lyman Beecher, for one year
James Clark
Alexander Campbell

Geography

Adjacent counties
 Franklin County  (northwest)
 Scott County  (northeast)
 Fayette County  (east)
 Jessamine County  (southeast)
 Mercer County  (southwest)
 Anderson County  (west)

Demographics

As of the census of 2000, there were 23,208 people, 8,893 households, and 6,643 families residing in the county. The racial makeup of the county was 92.08% White, 5.41% Black or African American, 0.13% Native American, 0.31% Asian, 0.01% Pacific Islander, 1.13% from other races, and 0.93% from two or more races.  2.99% of the population were Hispanic or Latino of any race.

There were 8,893 households, out of which 35.00% had children under the age of 18 living with them, 61.90% were married couples living together, 9.70% had a female householder with no husband present, and 25.30% were non-families. 21.00% of all households were made up of individuals, and 7.50% had someone living alone who was 65 years of age or older.  The average household size was 2.57 and the average family size was 2.99.

In the county, the population was spread out, with 25.40% under the age of 18, 7.90% from 18 to 24, 31.20% from 25 to 44, 25.10% from 45 to 64, and 10.40% who were 65 years of age or older.  The median age was 37 years. For every 100 females, there were 93.00 males.  For every 100 females age 18 and over, there were 91.20 males.

The median income for a household in the county was $49,491, and the median income for a family was $58,218. Males had a median income of $39,284 versus $27,972 for females. The per capita income for the county was $22,839.  About 5.20% of families and 7.30% of the population were below the poverty line, including 8.00% of those under age 18 and 13.10% of those age 65 or over.

Arts and culture

Tourism

Woodford County is home to one of Kentucky's oldest bourbon whiskey distilleries, Labrot & Graham (established 1812, now owned by Brown–Forman, which produces the Woodford Reserve brand); and to the Life Adventure Center, the Weisenberger flour mill and the Kentucky Castle.

Education
 Huntertown Elementary
 Northside Elementary
 Southside Elementary
 St. Leo's (Serves K-8/Private)
 Simmons Elementary
 Woodford County High School
 Woodford County Middle School
 Woodford Christian School K-5 (Private)
 Midway University

Politics
Since 1956, Woodford County has generally voted Republican at the federal level. However, it sometimes votes for Democrats statewide, which it did for Andy Beshear in the 2019 gubernatorial election.

Notable residents
 Chris Hogan, New York Times best-selling author, motivational speaker, financial guru
John Buford, Union cavalry officer during the American Civil War, was born in Woodford County but grew up in Illinois.
 Albert Benjamin "Happy" Chandler, Sr., Governor of Kentucky, baseball commissioner
 Ben Chandler, U.S. Representative
 John Conlee, country music singer
 Charles W. Field, United States Army officer and Doorkeeper of the United States House of Representatives
 Thomas Marshall (1730–1802), colonel of the 3rd Virginia Regiment in the American Revolution; father of the future Chief Justice John Marshall
 Chad Pennington, former NFL quarterback
 Charles Scott, Brig. General during the American Revolution and fourth Governor of Kentucky 1808-12
 William Shatner, actor
 William T. Sterling, Wisconsin legislator and pioneer
 William A. Trimble, United States Senator

Communities

Cities
 Midway
 Versailles (county seat)

Unincorporated communities
 Millville
 Nonesuch
 Mortonsville
 Milner
 Pinckard
 Huntertown
 Mundy's Landing
 Pisgah
 Wallace
 Troy
Keene
Jackson Town
Clover Bottom

See also

 National Register of Historic Places listings in Woodford County, Kentucky

References

External links
 Government web site
 Community web site
 Chamber of Commerce
 City-Data.com

 
Kentucky counties
Lexington–Fayette metropolitan area
1788 establishments in Virginia
Populated places established in 1788
Former counties of Virginia